King of Hearts is a 1947 German comedy film directed by Helmut Weiss and starring Hans Nielsen, Aribert Wäscher, and Sonja Ziemann.

The film was the first production of Artur Brauner's CCC Films, which would develop into a leading company in West German cinema. It was made at the Tempelhof Studios in Berlin. The film's sets were designed by the art director Ernst H. Albrecht.

In the Soviet Zone of Germany, it was released by the state-owned company DEFA.

Cast

References

Bibliography

External links 
 

1947 films
1947 comedy films
German comedy films
West German films
1940s German-language films
Films directed by Helmut Weiss
Films shot at Tempelhof Studios
German films based on plays
German black-and-white films
1940s German films